Mimeresia libentina, the common harlequin, is a butterfly in the family Lycaenidae. It is found in Sierra Leone, Liberia, Ivory Coast, Ghana, Togo, Nigeria, Cameroon, Equatorial Guinea and Gabon. The habitat consists of forests.

Adults feed on nectar from extrafloral nectaries.

Subspecies
 Mimeresia libentina libentina (Sierra Leone, Liberia, Ivory Coast, Ghana, Togo, southern Nigeria)
 Mimeresia libentina isabellae (Schultze, 1917) (Ghana, Nigeria, Cameroon, Equatorial Guinea: Bioko and Rio Muni, Gabon)

References

Butterflies described in 1866
Poritiinae
Butterflies of Africa
Taxa named by William Chapman Hewitson